Chris Nero (born 14 February 1981) is an Australian/Italian former professional rugby league footballer. He last played in the Super League for Salford City Reds. Nero left the Bradford Bulls at the end of the 2010 season to play for Salford City Reds.

Playing career
Nero joined the Huddersfield Giants in 2004 and was a consistent try scorer for the club.
Nero played for Huddersfield Giants in the 2006 Challenge Cup Final at  but the Huddersfield Giants lost 12–42 against St. Helens.
It was announced in August 2007 that he would leave the Huddersfield Giants.

Nero joined the Bradford Bulls in September 2007 after spending three years at the Huddersfield Giants. He was voted 'Player's' Player of the Year and was a great addition to the Bradford Bulls side. His direct running and combination of speed and power meant he was equally effective in the second row or in the centres, and he had been a consistent try scorer in both positions. He was also a tremendous tackler and quickly became a favourite with the Bradford Bulls fans.

After his sparkling form,  Nero (then 28) was linked with a move to fellow Super League club Wigan Warriors as a replacement for the retiring George Carmont.

References

External links
 Bradford Bulls Profile

1981 births
Living people
Australian people of Italian descent
Australian expatriate sportspeople in England
Australian rugby league players
Bradford Bulls players
Huddersfield Giants players
Italian rugby league players
Italian expatriate sportspeople in England
Rugby league centres
Rugby league second-rows
Rugby league players from Sydney
Salford Red Devils players
St. George Illawarra Dragons players